Aguiar is a Galician-Portuguese surname. Notable people with the surname include:

Antone S. Aguiar Jr. (1930–2014), American judge and politician
Bruno Aguiar, Portuguese footballer
Ernani Aguiar, Brazilian composer, choral conductor, and musicologist
Guma Aguiar, Brazilian-born American energy industrialist
João Aguiar (writer) (1943–2010), Portuguese writer and journalist
João Aguiar (swimmer)
Joselia Aguiar, Brazilian writer
Luis Aguiar, Uruguayan footballer
Fernando Aguiar, Portuguese footballer

See also
Aguiar (Barcelos), a civil parish in the municipality of Barcelos
Aguilar (surname), Spanish variant

Galician-language surnames
Portuguese-language surnames